Elections to Pembrokeshire County Council were held on 10 June 2004. It was preceded by the 1999 election and followed by the 2008 election. The results were drawn from the Pembrokeshire County Council website but the relevant page has now (2013) been deleted.  On the same day there were elections to  the other 21 local authorities in Wales (all except Anglesey), and to community council elections in Wales. There were also elections elsewhere in the United Kingdom

Overview
All 60 council seats were up for election. The previous council was controlled by Independents as had been the case since the authority was formed in 1995. The Independents retained control in 2004 and Labour achieved its worst result of the three elections fought thus far.

|}

Results

Amroth

Burton
Wildman had been elected as a Conservative in 1999, defeating the sitting Independent councillor, but he subsequently joined the Independents himself.

Camrose

Carew

Cilgerran

Clydau

Crymych

Dinas Cross

East Williamston

Fishguard North East

Fishguard North West

Goodwick

Haverfordwest Castle

Haverfordwest Garth

Haverfordwest Portfield

Haverfordwest Prendergast

Haverfordwest Priory

Hundleton

Johnston

Kilgetty

Lampeter Velfrey

Lamphey

Letterston

Llangwm

Llanrhian

Maenclochog

Manorbier

Martletwy

Merlin’s Bridge

Milford Central

Milford East

Milford Hakin

Milford Hubberston

Milford North

Milford West

Narberth

Narberth Rural

Newport

Neyland East

Neyland West

Pembroke Monkton

Pembroke St Mary North

Pembroke St Mary South

Pembroke St Michael

Pembroke Dock Central

Pembroke Dock Llanion

Pembroke Dock Market

Pembroke Dock Pennar

Penally

Rudbaxton

St David's

St Dogmaels

St Ishmael's

Saundersfoot

Scleddau

Solva

Tenby North

Tenby South

The Havens

Wiston

By-elections

2007 Pembroke St Michael by-election

Due to the death of the sitting councillor John Allen in July 2007, a by-election was called for the Pembroke St Michael seat. It took place on 20 November 2007, and saw Conservative candidate Aden Brinn narrowly elected as councillor ahead of Liberal Democrat candidate Gareth Jones, with a nine vote majority.

References

Sources

2004
2004 Welsh local elections
21st century in Pembrokeshire